Dahanabad (also Romanized as Dahanābād, Dahen Abad, and Dehnābād; also known as Rahnābād) is a village in Razmavaran Rural District, in the Central District of Rafsanjan County, Kerman Province, Iran. At the 2006 census, its population was 537, in 116 families.

References 

Populated places in Rafsanjan County